The New Jersey Generals are a professional American football team based in New Jersey. The Generals compete in the United States Football League (USFL) as a member club of the league's North division. The team plays its home games in Tom Benson Hall of Fame Stadium in Canton, Ohio. The stadium is shared with the Pittsburgh Maulers.

The Generals were one of eight teams that joined the USFL in 2022, and they are one of seven of that group still existing. They currently are the only team to have a Most Valuable Player (MVP) award winner, KaVontae Turpin (2022).

History 
The New Jersey Generals were one of eight teams that were officially announced as a USFL franchise on The Herd with Colin Cowherd on November 22, 2021. USFL co-founder Brian Woods had been using the Generals brand for teams in The Spring League since 2019. On January 6, 2022, it was announced on The Herd with Colin Cowherd that former NFL, AAF, and NCAA Football Head coach Mike Riley was named the Head coach and General manager of the Generals.

The team was placed to select fourth overall in the 2022 USFL Draft, where they selected Ben Holmes. Holmes was injured in training camp and ultimately released, but this allowed for the Generals to sign Luis Perez, who impressed during the season, starting only 6 games, finishing in the top 5 in passing yards and touchdowns. The Generals also selected KaVontae Turpin as their top receiver, who lead the USFL in receiving yards (540), coupled with 4 touchdowns. He was also selected as to the All-USFL Team, alongside fellow teammates Darius Victor, Terry Poole, Garrett McGhin, Toby Johnson and Shalom Luani in addition to winning USFL Most Valuable Player Award. The Generals won the top seed in the North Division with a 9–1 record. Despite the top seed in the North Division, the Generals were upset by the Philadelphia Stars, 19–14 in the North Division Championship Game.

On October 18, 2022, the team hired Billy Devaney as the team's general manager.

Championships

Division championships

Players

Current roster 
Initially, each team carried a 38-man active roster and a 7-man practice squad, but the rosters were increased to 40 active players and 50 total in May, 2022.

USFL MVP award winners

USFL Offensive Player of the Year award winners

Coaches

Current staff

Statistics and records

Season-by-season record

Note: The Finish, Wins, Losses, and Ties columns list regular season results and exclude any postseason play.

Records

References 

2021 establishments in Alabama
American football teams established in 2021
New Jersey Generals (2022)
American football teams in New Jersey
United States Football League (2022) teams